Harvey David Simeon Perigeault Monte (born 8 October 1981 in Willemstad, Curaçao, Netherlands Antilles) is a Dutch baseball player.

Monte represented the Netherlands at the 2004 Summer Olympics in Athens where he and his team became sixth.

External links
Monte at the Dutch Olympic Archive

1981 births
Living people
2006 World Baseball Classic players
Baseball players at the 2004 Summer Olympics
Dutch baseball players
Olympic baseball players of the Netherlands
People from Willemstad
Everett AquaSox players
Wisconsin Timber Rattlers players
Curaçao expatriate baseball players in the United States
DOOR Neptunus players
ADO players
Sparta-Feyenoord players